Indian Horse is a novel by Canadian writer Richard Wagamese, published by Douglas & McIntyre in 2012. The novel centres on Saul Indian Horse, a First Nations boy from Ontario who survives the residential school system and becomes a talented ice hockey player, only for his past traumas to resurface in his adulthood.

Wagamese's best known work, Indian Horse won the 2013 Burt Award for First Nations, Métis and Inuit Literature, and was a competing title in the 2013 edition of Canada Reads.

A film adaptation, Indian Horse, was directed by Stephen Campanelli and premiered at the 2017 Toronto International Film Festival. As of 2022, it is available for streaming on Netflix.

Plot 

In 1961, the Indian Horse family—an Ojibway family consisting of eight-year-old Saul, his grandmother Naomi, and his Christian parents John and Mary—live in the wilderness of Northern Ontario, hiding from the authorities, who previously took Saul's siblings, Benjamin and Rachel, to residential schools. When Benjamin suddenly returns after escaping a residential school, the family moves to Gods Lake, a remote region where their ancestors lived. Benjamin soon dies of tuberculosis, and his parents take his body away on a canoe to be blessed by a priest, leaving Saul with his grandmother. Winter sets in but the parents have not returned; Naomi tries to lead Saul to Minaki for shelter, but their canoe is overturned in rapids. Suffering from the freezing cold, they run out of supplies, and Naomi dies at a railway depot outside Minaki. Saul is found by the authorities and is taken to St. Jerome's Indian Residential School in White River.

At St. Jerome's, headed by Father Quinney and Sister Ignacia, Saul witnesses daily abuse of the children; some die, commit suicide, or are traumatized. The same year, new priest Father Gaston Leboutilier joins the faculty, and he quickly becomes popular with the boys. He constructs a hockey rink outside and forms a hockey team composed of older boys. After watching Hockey Night in Canada on a television, Saul begs Father Leboutilier to allow him to play, but he is prevented from doing so because of his young age. Father Leboutilier allows Saul to clean the rink each morning, and Saul uses part of that time to practice hockey. After a player is injured during a scrimmage, Father Leboutilier allows Saul to play and is astounded by his high skill level. Father Quinney, noticing Saul's talent, allows him to join the team. St. Jerome's plays against White River, and Saul leads his team to victory. Father Leboutilier begins to practice and train with Saul. Saul is invited to play for the White River midget hockey team, though he is soon kicked out over his ethnicity.

In 1966, when Saul is thirteen, he is invited by Fred Kelly to live with his Ojibway family in Manitouwadge and play for the Manitouwadge Moose junior hockey team (nicknamed "the Moose"), coached by Fred and captained by their son Virgil. Father Quinney and Father Leboutilier allow Saul to leave St. Jerome's. Saul, Virgil, and the rest of the Moose get along quickly; despite his smaller size and younger age, Saul's skills allow him to lead the Moose to numerous victories against teams from reserves across Northern Ontario. Saul reunites with Father Leboutilier after a game in Pic River, and they share one last exchange before Father Leboutilier leaves. Saul never sees him again.

Eventually, the Moose are invited to play against the Kapuskasing Chiefs, a senior A team from the Northern Hockey Association and their first non-Indigenous opponent. They win, and are invited to play against teams from towns and cities along the Trans-Canada Highway and across Northern Ontario. However, the Moose are often heckled by the audience over their ethnicity, and the opposing players mock, fight, and intentionally bodycheck them during games. At one point, while eating at a café near Chapleau, the team has an altercation with a group of men who, one by one, beat and urinate on all of them except Saul, who they spare due to his young age and his hockey skills. After the Moose beat the Owen Sound Clippers in a rough game where Saul manages to show considerable restraint, Saul is scouted by the Toronto Marlboros, a feeder team for the Toronto Maple Leafs. Although Saul is initially reluctant to leave, Virgil and the Moose persuade Saul to join the Marlboros.

Now sixteen, Saul travels to Toronto to attend the Marlboros' training camp. Saul makes the team, but he is viewed as an outsider by the press, the audience, and the other players, who all discriminate against him. Saul starts to react violently, and he returns to Manitouwadge after being benched indefinitely. There, Saul becomes a logger; harassed by coworkers, he viciously attacks one in retaliation. He rejoins the Moose, but plays very aggressively. When Saul realizes his teammates have stopped talking to him as a result of his violence, he leaves Manitouwadge once he turns eighteen.

Saul travels across Canada for several years, taking any low-level labor job he can find. He becomes an alcoholic and travels to Redditt in 1978, the same town where his family had reunited with Benjamin. Saul meets Ervin Sift, a farmer who offers him a job and a home, but Saul, who feels empty inside, leaves for Winnipeg, Manitoba. After a seizure there, he is hospitalized and accepted by the New Dawn Centre, an Indigenous rehabilitation center, where he meets his counselor, Moses, and has a vivid spiritual experience where he sees his deceased family, including his great-grandfather Shabogeesick, the first "Indian Horse".

Saul returns to White River and visits St. Jerome's, now long closed and in severe disrepair. He breaks down in the abandoned hockey rink as he finally acknowledges his past trauma: Father Leboutilier routinely molested and raped Saul, who used hockey as a means of escaping his trauma and personal guilt. Saul returns to Minaki, rents a boat, and travels back to Gods Lake. He has another spiritual experience where he sees his family and ancestors, and he has a brief discussion with Shabogeesick.

Saul returns to Manitouwadge, where he reconnects with Fred and his wife Martha, both residential school survivors, who he learns had also endured abuse. He also reconnects with his foster brother Virgil, now coach of a bantam hockey team at the town's new rink. Saul suggests that he coach the bantam team, of which Virgil's son Billy is a member, and Virgil invites Saul for a game of hockey with his former teammates. Later that night, waiting for Virgil and the Moose, Saul notices a ball of tape on the rink, and he begins to practice with it, much like he did at St. Jerome's, as Virgil, the Moose, and their families arrive.

Writing and development 
Indian Horse is in the form of a memoir written by Saul at the New Dawn Centre, as an alternative to him telling his story to the group there.

According to Wagamese, he originally intended to write a novel about hockey, but the legacy of the residential school system gradually became a focal point of the story. He said that writing the book took him about five times longer than it typically would have "because of the emotional territory it covers". Although Wagamese did not attend a residential school, he was affected by that system because his mother, aunts, and uncles were residential school survivors.

Reception 
Indian Horse won the 2013 Burt Award for First Nations, Métis and Inuit Literature.

Indian Horse was a competing title in the 2013 edition of Canada Reads. It was advocated by Carol Huynh. It lost to February by Lisa Moore.

In 2020, the novel's French translation, Cheval Indien, was selected for Le Combat des Livres, the French-language edition of Canada Reads. It was defended by Romeo Saganash.

Adaptation
It was adapted for a 2017 film of the same name, which is now streaming on Netflix. Directed by Stephen Campanelli, it starred as the adult Saul and has a largely Indigenous cast.

References

2012 Canadian novels
Novels by Richard Wagamese
Canadian novels adapted into films
Novels about ice hockey
Novels set in Ontario
Works about residential schools in Canada
Douglas & McIntyre books